Salvador Quesada (3 August 1886 – 24 November 1971) was a Cuban fencer. He competed in the individual and team épée competitions at the 1924 Summer Olympics.

References

External links
 

1886 births
1971 deaths
Cuban male fencers
Olympic fencers of Cuba
Fencers at the 1924 Summer Olympics
People from Manzanillo, Cuba